Ramsey Lake is a lake in Sudbury, Ontario, located near the city's downtown core.

"Ramsey" is the correct spelling of the lake's name, although some sources refer to it as "Ramsay"; different sources give the lake's name in both the "Lake Ramsey" and "Ramsey Lake" forms. Prior to the establishment of the modern city of Sudbury, the lake was known to the local Ojibwe population as Bitimagamasing, or "water that lies on the side of the hill".

Science North is located on the southwest corner of the lake, and offers the William Ramsey boat tour, formerly the Cortina, of the lake several times daily during the summer. The city's Bell Park is also located nearby, and the Jim Gordon Boardwalk connects the two sites along the lakeshore. Laurentian University is also located near the lake's southern shore. Residential neighbourhoods immediately south of the lake are among the wealthiest in the city. On the eastern end of the lake, Moonlight Beach is a popular recreational facility, and the Lake Laurentian Conservation Area is a large wilderness park which offers both recreational and environmental education programs.

Ecology

Ramsey Lake was also the site of one of the city's first major environmental reclamation projects. Due to air pollution problems in the area, the lake — which has few water flow outlets — was considered a dead lake for many years. However, following the 1972 construction of the Inco Superstack, which dispersed smelter emissions from the city's mining industry over a wider area, a major environmental project was launched to clean up the lake's water and reintroduce aquatic life.

The project, which was successful, led to further initiatives to improve the city's environment, including a major tree planting initiative. In 1992, the United Nations presented the city of Sudbury with an award to recognize the city's innovative environmental reclamation strategies.

Blue-green algae blooms that can produce toxins may be present in the lake.

Ramsey Lake now has a diverse population of fish, which includes walleye, northern pike, smallmouth bass, yellow perch, white sucker, pumpkinseed, and rock bass.

Pop culture

Ramsey Lake was cited in the modern television show Heroes. The body of Eden McCain was found there after her murder by the serial killer Sylar. The American scriptwriters erroneously placed it "100 miles out of Ontario".

See also
List of lakes in Ontario

References

Ramsey